West Hanningfield is a small village and civil parish in south Essex, England. The village is in the borough of Chelmsford and in the parliamentary constituency of Rayleigh.

It is located to the north of Hanningfield Reservoir.  Surrounding villages include South Hanningfield, Stock, Rettendon and East Hanningfield.  It is also close to the Chelmsford suburbs of Galleywood and Great Baddow.

The local public house is known as the Three Compasses.  The village also contains a primary school, a village hall and a hairdresser. It is the home of Lord Hanningfield the disgraced Tory Peer and former Conservative leader of Essex County Council.

The Church of St Mary and St Edward is Grade II* listed church in the east end of the village. It is of twelfth-century origin, with considerable alterations made in the eighteenth and nineteenth centuries. It has a weather boarded timber-framed tower, thought to date from the early thirteenth century, with timbers recently dated as being felled between AD 1382–1414. The bells were cast in 1676, and are a rare example of a complete seventeenth-century ring, although not operable for some time. The Church Buildings Council consider them of historic significance. A Whitechapel Bell Foundry report noted that the bellframe was cut to install the bells.

See also
East Hanningfield
South Hanningfield
Lord Hanningfield

References

External links

Villages in Essex